The 1899 Washington & Jefferson football team was an American football team that represented Washington & Jefferson College as an independent during the 1899 college football season.  Led by S. W. Black in his first and only year as head coach, the team compiled a record of 9–2–1.

Schedule

References

Washington and Jefferson
Washington & Jefferson Presidents football seasons
Washington and Jefferson football